Jean-François Laffillé (born 7 May 1962) is a French former cyclist. He competed in the road race at the 1988 Summer Olympics.

References

External links
 

1962 births
Living people
French male cyclists
Olympic cyclists of France
Cyclists at the 1988 Summer Olympics
People from Eu, Seine-Maritime
Sportspeople from Seine-Maritime
Cyclists from Normandy